Loreta is a feminine given name. People bearing the name Loreta include:
Loreta (1911–1998), Iranian actress
Loreta Anilionytė (born 19??), Lithuanian philosopher, writer and translator
Loreta Graužinienė (born 1963),  Lithuanian politician
Loreta Gulotta (born 1987), Italian fencer
Loreta Janeta Velázquez (1842–1923), Cuban-American who masqueraded as a male Confederate soldier during the American Civil Wa 

Lithuanian feminine given names